Chase Bank Kenya Limited (CBK), commonly referred to as Chase Bank, was a commercial bank in Kenya, licensed by the Central Bank of Kenya, the central bank and national banking regulator.

Chase Bank was a large financial services provider in Kenya, with an estimated asset valuation of approximately US$1.428 billion (KES:142 billion), as of December 2015. At that time, shareholders' equity was valued at US$119.7 million (KES:11.9 billion).

History
In 1995, several business people acquired a 60% stake in United Bank (Kenya), after paying approximately US$1.23 million (Kenya Shillings 95 million).

At that time, United Bank (Kenya) was in receivership and was under statutory administration by the Central Bank of Kenya, the country's banking regulator. Its paid-up capital, then, was approximately US$970,000 and it had an asset base valued at approximately US$1.9 million. In 1996, the bank opened for business under the new owners who rebranded to its present name. In 1997, a decision was made to relocate the bank's only branch at the time, from Kisumu to Nairobi. Over the years, Chase Bank (Kenya) has progressively improved its bottom line by growing its customer base and increasing its profitability.

Statutory management 
On 7 April 2016, Chase Bank was placed under receivership by the Central Bank of Kenya making it the third bank to be placed under receivership in a twelve-month period. This was mainly due under reporting of insider loans and not meeting the statutory banking ratios. Chase Bank re-opened on 27 April 2016 with KCB as the receiver manager.

In April 2016, the bank was put under statutory management by the CBK following what it termed 'unsafe financial conditions'. The liquidity problems that it faced followed social media reports after the resignation of two of its directors. The reports showed that its profits in 2015 fell to Ksh. 742 million from 2.3 billion in 2014. The statements also revealed that non performing loans had risen from Ksh. 3 billion in 2014 to Ksh. 11 billion in 2015.

In April 2016, Inspector General of Police Joseph Boinnet ordered the arrest of Chase bank's executives to answer questions about mismanagement in the bank. After closure for two weeks, the bank reopened on 27 April 2016 under management of Kenya Commercial Bank.

Liquidation 
In April 2018, the central bank announced that State Bank of Mauritius would be acquiring certain assets and matched liabilities from Chase Bank's. This deal included 75% of deposits, bank staff and branches and merging them with the operations of its Kenyan subsidiary, SBM Kenya. The remaining assets and liabilities were then transferred to Kenya Deposit Insurance Corporation for liquidation.

Ownership
In March 2013, Amethis Finance, a development finance company based in Paris, France, invested US$10.5 million (KES:900 million) into the bank, thereby taking an equity position in Chase Bank (Kenya). In October 2013, a European Private Equity Fund, invested KSh1.5 billion into the bank, taking up an equity position into the institution.

, the shareholders in the stock of the bank are summarized in the table below:

Member Companies

Subsidiaries 
Other than the banking business, Chase Bank has the following subsidiaries:
RAFIKI Microfinance Bank Limited – 75% Shareholding – A deposit-taking microfinance bank.
 Chase Insurance Agency Limited – 100% Shareholding – The Insurance agency arm of the business.

Branches
, the bank maintains a network of branches at the following locations:

 Nairobi Branches
 City Centre Branch – Prudential Assurance Building, Wabera Street Nairobi
 Buru Buru Branch – Kenol Buru Buru, Mumias South Road, Nairobi
 Diamond Plaza Branch – Diamond Plaza, Parklands, Nairobi
 Donholm Branch – East Gate Shopping Mall, Nairobi
 Eastleigh Branch – Sunrise Shopping Mall, First Avenue, Eastleigh, Nairobi,
 Elite Banking Centre – 1st Floor, ABC Towers, Waiyaki Way, Nairobi
 Embakasi Branch – Ground Floor, Taj Shopping Mall, Outer Ring Road, Embakasi, Nairobi
 Hurlingham Branch – Ground Floor, Northern Wing, Landmark Plaza, Argwings Kodhek Road, Nairobi
 Ngara Branch – Peace Plaza, Ngara Road, Nairobi
 Parklands Branch – Ground Floor, Mediplaza, Third Avenue, Parklands, Nairobi
 Riverside Mews Branch – Riverside Mews, Riverside Drive, Nairobi
 Sameer Park Branch – Sameer Park, Mombasa Road, Nairobi
 Strathmore Branch – Strathmore Student Center, Madaraka Estate, Ole Sangale Road, Nairobi
 Upper Hill Branch – KMA Centre, Junction of Chyulu / Mara Road, Upper Hill, Nairobi
 Village Market Branch – 3rd Level, Village Market, Limuru Road, Gigiri, Nairobi
 Windsor Branch – Ridgeways Mall, Kiambu Road, Nairobi
 Ongata Rongai Branch – Masaai Mall, Rongai Road Nairobi
 Delta Branch – Delta Towers, Westlands Roundabout Nairobi
 Lunga Lunga Branch, next to Tuskys Lunga Lunga, Industrial Area Nairobi
 River Road Branch – Sundries Plaza, Ground floor, River Road Next to Sagret Hotel Nairobi
 Kilimani Branch – Adlife Plaza, Kilimani Nairobi
 Kasuku Express Branch – Kasuku Center, Kileleshwa Nairobi
 Karen Branch – Water Mark, Business Plaza, Karen Nairobi
 Lavington Branch – 3rd Floor, Lavington Green Mall, Lavington Nairobi 
 Kimathi Branch – Ansh Plaza, Kimathi Street Nairobi
 Madaraka Express Branch – Along Langata Road Opp Getrudes at TOTAL Gas Station Nairobi

 Mombasa Branches
 Bondeni Branch – Ground Floor, Suhufi Palace, Abdel Nasser Road, Mombasa
 Mombasa Branch – Ground Floor, Jubilee Building, Moi Avenue, Mombasa
 Nyali Branch – Nyali Plaza, Links Road, Mombasa
 Mtwapa Branch – Tuskys Mall, Mtwapa Mombasa
 Old Town Branch – Opposite Central Police Station Mombasa
 KPA Branch – KPA Mombasa
 Kilifi Express Branch – Kenol Kobil, Kilifi Road Kilifi

 Upcountry branches
 Eldoret Branch – Utamaduni Building, Kenyatta Street, Eldoret
 Kisii Branch – Royal Towers, Hospital Road, Kisii
 Kisumu Branch – West Emporium, Oginga Odinga Street, Kisumu
 Kisumu Express – Naivas Mall, Jomo Kenyatta Road, Kisumu
 Malindi Branch – Links Road, Opposite Multi Grocers Limited, Malindi
 Nakuru Branch – Spikes Business Centre, Kenyatta Avenue, Nakuru
 Thika Branch – Nelleon Building, Kenyatta Avenue, Thika
 Machakos Branch – at Naivas House, along Mwatu wa Ngoma Rd., Machakos Town Machakos
 Garissa Branch – Lilac Plaza along Kismayu Road
 Narok Branch – Ol Talet Mall. Ground Floor, Opposite KCB Along Nairobi Kisii Highway Narok 
 Kitale Branch – Nakumatt Mall, Mega Centre Kitale
 Kericho Branch – Ratan Plaza along Kenyatta Road Kericho

Governance
The bank is governed by an eight-person board of directors. Musoni Kuria, is the Chairman of the Board. Paul Njaga, serves as the managing director and chief executive officer.

See also
 List of banks in Kenya
 Central Bank of Kenya
 Economy of Kenya

References

External links
 Website of Chase Bank (Kenya)
 Website of Central Bank of Kenya
 Profile at Linkedin.com

Defunct banks of Kenya
Companies based in Nairobi
Banks established in 1996
Kenyan companies established in 1996